Duncan Cooper may refer to:

Duncan Cooper (cricketer) (c. 1813–1904), Indian-born Australian cricketer
Duncan Cooper (footballer), English footballer
Duncan Brown Cooper (1844–1922), American journalist, publisher and politician